Casimir III may refer to:
King Casimir III of Poland (1310–1370), last King of Poland from the Piast dynasty
Casimir III, Duke of Pomerania (1348–1372), oldest son of Barnim III, Duke of Pomerania-Stettin
 Casimir III of Płock